"Teketzis" (Ο τεκετζής (el)) is a Greek folkloric tune of Karsilamas. This type of karsilamas is also called aïdinikos (see the section ondance), and the rhythm has nine beats (2+2+2+3). Its music was composed Greek Spyros Peristeris. Greek lyrics written by Spyros Peristeris.

See also
Aise
Yaman Ayşem

References

Greek songs
Songs written by Spyros Peristeris
Year of song missing